Werner Wanker (born 8 April 1958) is an Austrian curler. He is the first thrower in the Kitzbühl CC team, which has often represented Austria in international competitions, and also "Österreichischer Curling Staatsmeister 2004".

At the national level, he is six-time Austrian men's champion curler.

Teams

References

External links

 

1958 births
Living people
Austrian male curlers
Austrian curling champions
Place of birth missing (living people)